The 1999 Dubai Tennis Championships was a tennis tournaments played on outdoor hard courts at the Aviation Club Tennis Centre in Dubai in the United Arab Emirates that were part of the World Series of the 1999 ATP Tour. The tournament was held from February 8 through February 14, 1999.

Seeds
Champion seeds are indicated in bold text while text in italics indicates the round in which those seeds were eliminated.

Draw

Finals

References

1999 Dubai Tennis Championships
Doubles